Schwarzmüller Group, is an Austrian supplier of towed commercial vehicles.

In 2016, the company employed 2,200 employees, of these around 850 in Austria. Since January 2016 the company is led by Roland Hartwig, Michael Weigand and Georg Preschern. At their production locations in Freinberg (Austria), Žebrák (Czech Republic) and Budapest (Hungary), Schwarzmüller manufactured more than 8,800 commercial vehicles with 2,290 employees in 2017 and generated a revenue of 349 Million Euros.

Schwarzmüller Group operates among an international organisation in 19 countries in Central and Eastern Europe. Besides the three production facilities in Austria, The Czech Republic and Hungary, they have several distribution and service sites in twelve countries.

History

Establishment and expansion 

The company was founded in 1870 by Joseph Schwarzmüller as a Forge in Passau (Germany). In 1921 the first truck trailer with wooden-spoked wheels and completely rubber tyres was produced. In 1936 the company followed the relocation of business sites to Freinberg (Upper Austria), by Joseph Schwarzmüller junior. In 1958 the company comprised four service plants in Austria and one in Germany.

Expansion 

With the opening of the production facility in Budapest (Hungary) in 1990 the expansion began. Three years later, the third production facility was opened in Žebrák (Czech Republic) and in 2009 a further production facility followed in Bucharest (Romania).

Strategic orientation 

From 1966 the range of products was widened from flatbed trailers, tipper trailers and wood trailers to tanker trailers. In 2001 Schwarzmüller developed the trough-tipper vehicle in a lightweight design. This vehicle should combine weight optimisation with stability.

In 2009, at the company site in Freinberg, a completely automatic longitudinal girder assembly was added to the production facilities. In the same year Schwarzmüller produced the first moving floor trailer with a steel and aluminium frame. In 2012 the company released the newly developed ultralight flatbed trailer onto the market. In 2014 the thermally moulded tipper bed trailer, the Tele-Mega-Flatbed and the 3 Axle Double Wedge Tanker Trailer followed.

Since 2014, Schwarzmüller has been represented at the big trade shows, like the Bauma in Munich or the IAA in Hannover.

Products

Product groups 

Schwarzmüller offers eight product groups:
 Curtainsiders 
 Tipper Trailers
 Wood Trailers
 Moving Floor Trailers
 Low-Loader Trailers
 Tanker Trailers
 Trailer Chassis
 Refrigerated Trailers
Sectors which employ Schwarzmüller trailers are the long distance trucking industry, the Waste Disposal industry, the Construction Industry, the Mineral Oil industry, the Food industry and Timber Industry.

Gallery

External links 

 Website

References 

1870 establishments in Austria
Companies established in 1870
Vehicle manufacturers of Austria
Austrian brands
Trailer manufacturing companies
Manufacturing companies established in 1870